USS Ingraham (DD-111) was a  built for the United States Navy during World War I.

Description
The Wickes class was an improved and faster version of the preceding . Two different designs were prepared to the same specification that mainly differed in the turbines and boilers used. The ships built to the Bethlehem Steel design, built in the Fore River and Union Iron Works shipyards, mostly used Yarrow boilers that deteriorated badly during service and were mostly scrapped during the 1930s. They had a crew of 6 officers and 108 enlisted men.

Performance differed radically between the ships of the class, often due to poor workmanship. The Wickes class was powered by two steam turbines, each driving one propeller shaft, using steam provided by four water-tube boilers.

The ships were armed with four 4-inch (102 mm) guns in single mounts and were fitted with two 1-pounder guns for anti-aircraft defense. Their primary weapon, though, was their torpedo battery of a dozen 21 inch (533 mm) torpedo tubes in four triple mounts. In many ships a shortage of 1-pounders caused them to be replaced by 3-inch (76 mm) anti-aircraft (AA) guns. They also carried a pair of depth charge rails. A "Y-gun" depth charge thrower was added to many ships.

Construction and career
Ingraham, named for Duncan Nathaniel Ingraham, was launched 4 July 1918 by the Union Iron Works, San Francisco, California; sponsored by Mrs. Alfred S. Gann; and commissioned 15 May 1919. Ingraham departed 20 May for her shakedown cruise, transiting the Panama Canal and arriving Newport, Rhode Island 6 June. After repairs in New York, she sailed for a European tour of duty. While visiting Ostend, Belgium 22 September, she carried the King and Queen of Belgium to Calais, France. The destroyer returned to San Diego 8 January 1920 via New York and the Canal Zone to begin conversion to a minelayer.

Reclassified DM-9, Ingraham began minelaying exercises January 1921 along the California coast before departing Mare Island 7 June. She arrived at Pearl Harbor 18 June and engaged in operations there until she decommissioned at Pearl Harbor 29 June 1922. Her name was struck from the Navy List 1 December 1936 and she was sunk as target off Pearl Harbor on 23 July 1937.

Notes

References

 

NavSource Naval History, USS INGRAHAM (DD-111 / DM-9)

External links
 NavSource Photos

Wickes-class destroyers
Ships built in San Francisco
1918 ships
Wickes-class destroyer minelayers